Venus Williams was the defending champion, but did not compete this year.

Kim Clijsters won the title by defeating Jennifer Capriati 4–6, 6–4, 6–2 in the final.

Seeds
The first five seeds received a bye into the second round.

Draw

Finals

Top half

Bottom half

References

External links
 Official results archive (ITF)
 Official results archive (WTA)

2003 WTA Tour
Silicon Valley Classic